Cornice Peak,  2824 m -> 9265 feet, is a mountain in the Sir Sandford Range of the Selkirk Mountains subdivision of the Columbia Mountains in British Columbia, Canada.  It is just southwest of Gold Arm of Columbia Reach of Kinbasket Lake.

See also
Cornice Peak (disambiguation)

References

Selkirk Mountains
Two-thousanders of British Columbia
Columbia Country
Kootenay Land District